The Wallaceburg Satans are the first Canadian men's senior semi-professional box lacrosse team to play in the Box Lacrosse League. The Satans play their home games out of the "Wonder on Wall St." Wallaceburg Memorial Arena in Wallaceburg, Ontario.

History 
The Satans made their inaugural appearance during the 2017 Box Lacrosse League. The first goal in franchise history was scored in Wallaceburg, during their first game at 2:21 in first period by Brady McDonald. The Satans won the game by the score of 11–6 over the Chicago Outlaws. Haven Moses and Bobby Smith split the win in net.

They finished the 2017 BLL regular season with a record of 5-1 and faced the Chicago Outlaws in the 2017 BLL Semi-Finals, played at the Midwest Orthopedic Sports Center in Brookfield, Wisconsin losing the game by a score of 12–11.

Prior to 2017 
Wallaceburg has been home to several other senior men's lacrosse teams. In 2016 Wallaceburg was the home to the OLA Sr. B Wallaceburg Thrashers who moved to Wallaceburg from Sarnia where they were called the Sarnia Beavers. Other former OLA Sr. B teams include the St. Clair Storm, who split games between, Wallaceburg, Sarnia, and Walpole Island.

Many other teams in Wallaceburg have played under the Satans banner, including both Senior B and Junior B teams in the 1960s and 1970s.

Retired Numbers 
George "Jug" McGaffey - #9

Season-by-Season 
Note: GP = Games Played, W = Wins, L = Losses, T = Ties, PTS = Points, GF = Goals For, GA = Goals Against

Current Players 

|}

References

External links
Wallaceburg Satans website

Lacrosse teams in Ontario